Nankai (Japanese: 南海) was a Dutch ship that was seized by Imperial Japanese Navy during World War II and converted into a gunboat.

History
She was laid down in 1941 at the Soerabaja Drydock (Droogdok Mij Soerabaja) as an auxiliary minelayer for the benefit of the Gouvernementsmarine and named Regulus. She was scuttled before completion by Dutch forces on 2 March 1942 after the Japanese occupation of the Dutch East Indies. She was seized by the Japanese, repaired, and launched on 21 May 1943. On 1 November 1943, she was assigned to the Yokosuka Naval District.

On 21 September 1944, Nankai departed Surabaya, Java escorting transport Hokkai Maru. Nankai and Hokkai Maru were towed and repaired at the No. 102 Naval Construction and Repair Department at Surabaya, Java.

She was struck from the Navy List on July 30, 1945.

References

Ram-class minelayers
1943 ships
Ships sunk by American submarines
Ships built in the Dutch East Indies
Maritime incidents in July 1945
Auxiliary ships of the Imperial Japanese Navy